The Diprotodontidae are an extinct family of large herbivorous marsupials, endemic to Australia and New Guinea during the Oligocene through Pleistocene periods from 28.4 million to 40,000 years ago. The family consisted of large quadrupedal terrestrial browsers, notably including the largest marsupial that ever lived, the rhino-sized Diprotodon. The group first appeared during the Late Oligocene, with representatives that were mostly sheep-sized, and substantially diversified beginning during the Late Miocene, reaching an apex of diversity during the Pliocene with seven genera, likely due to the increase of open forested landscapes. The last known members of the group including Diprotodon and Zygomaturus from mainland Australia, and Hulitherium and Maokopia from New Guinea became extinct during the Late Pleistocene around 40,000 years ago, after the arrival of humans to Australia-New Guinea.

References

 Vertebrate Palaeontology by Michael J. Benton (page 314)
 Wildlife of Gondwana: Dinosaurs and Other Vertebrates from the Ancient Supercontinent (Life of the Past) by Pat Vickers Rich, Thomas Hewitt Rich, Francesco Coffa, and Steven Morton
 Prehistoric Mammals of Australia and New Guinea: One Hundred Million Years of Evolution by John A. Long, Michael Archer, Timothy Flannery, and Suzanne Hand (page 77)

Prehistoric vombatiforms
Prehistoric mammal families
Clawed herbivores
Chattian first appearances
Pleistocene genus extinctions